Macaulay Langstaff (born 3 February 1997) is an English footballer who plays as a forward for Notts County in the National League.

Career 
After beginning his career with the academy of Middlesbrough, he signed with Stockton Town in 2014, joining their senior team as they won the Shipowner's Cup for the first time. He moved to Billingham Synthonia in 2015. After scoring 31 in goals in 46 games, he was signed by Gateshead in February 2017. He made five appearances before being loaned back to Billingham and to Blyth Spartans. He moved to York City in 2018.

In 2020 he returned to Gateshead for another two seasons. In his first season, he scored four goals in 16 appearances. In the 2021–22 season, he scored 32 goals across all competitions, leading the league, and was named Player of the Season. Gateshead earned promotion to the National League that season.

In 2022, Langstaff joined Notts County on a three-year contract, with a £50,000 transfer fee. In October, he became the first player to win back-to-back National League Player of the month awards. By mid-October he had scored 15 goals in 13 games and was being compared to Erling Haaland, as they vied to be the top scorer in the top five leagues.  As of 18 February 2023, Notts County were top of the National League and Langstaff was the league's top scorer with 30 goals in 33 games.

Honours
Gateshead
National League North: 2021–22

Individual
National League Player of the Month: August 2022, September 2022

References

Gateshead F.C. players
Notts County F.C. players
1997 births
Living people
English footballers
Association football forwards